Constantin "Costel" Enache (born 11 March 1973) is a Romanian football coach and former player, currently a manager.

Coaching career

Politehnica Iași
He was appointed as head coach of Liga II club Politehnica Iași in the summer of 2013, only to be released six months later due to bad results.

Botoșani
On 5 June 2017, Enache was appointed as head coach of Liga I club Botoșani. On 16 November 2018, Botoșani and Enache mutually agreed to end the coach's contract.

Astra Giurgiu
On 17 November 2018, Enache was appointed as head coach of Liga I club Astra Giurgiu. On 13 June 2019, Enache was replaced with Dan Alexa as the head coach of Astra Giurgiu.

Hermannstadt
On 17 June 2019, Enache was appointed as head coach of Liga I club Hermannstadt. On 30 September 2019, Hermannstadt and Enache mutually agreed to end the coach's contract.

Petrolul Ploiești
On 17 December 2019, Enache was appointed as head coach of Petrolul Ploiești.

Honours

Player
Ceahlăul Piatra Neamț
Divizia B: 1992–93

Manager
Astra Giurgiu
Romanian Cup Runner-up: 2018–19

References

External links
 Costel Enache at soccerway.com
 Costel Enache at romaniansoccer.ro

Notes
 First League appearances and goals only, the 1991–92 and 1992–93 Second League appearances and goals scored for Ceahlăul Piatra Neamț are unavailable.

1973 births
Living people
Romanian footballers
Association football midfielders
Liga I players
CSM Ceahlăul Piatra Neamț players
FC Progresul București players
FC UTA Arad players
Romanian football managers
CSM Ceahlăul Piatra Neamț managers
FC Politehnica Iași (2010) managers
FC Botoșani managers
FC Astra Giurgiu managers
FC Hermannstadt managers
FC Petrolul Ploiești managers
FC Universitatea Cluj managers
AFC Unirea Slobozia managers
Sportspeople from Piatra Neamț